Gamma Data (also referred to as CNG or CNG New Game Research) is a Chinese research institute specializing in video games, movies and television programmes. “China's Game Industry Report”, presented by Gamma Data and guided by the State Administration of Radio, Film and Television (SARFT) and sponsored by Game Publishers Association Publications Committee (GPC), is the most authoritative report in the gaming industry. Gamma Data’s government-commissioned and nationwide reports, insights, and analytics data results have been released in China Game Industry Annual Conference and ChinaJoy Summit Forum dozens of times during the last decade. Its data and views are also extensively quoted in prospectus, listing memorandums and strategy press conferences by a large number of gaming companies.

About company
Gamma Data is the research institute of Gamma New Media & Culture Co., Ltd., which was founded in 2010 in Beijing, China.  It focuses on cultural and creative industry including game industry (online download game, console game and mobile game) as well as motion picture and television industry (Internet film and television). Gamma Data advises on issues such as project assessment, market analysis, mergers & acquisitions and investment decisions with respect to its insights in the game industry and motion picture and television industry. It provides objective and impartial market researches and mass data reflecting the development and characteristics of these industries. The government-commissioned “China Gaming Industry Report”, presented by Gamma data, is the most authoritative report and widely acknowledged in China’s game industry. Nowadays, Gamma Data works with the government of Shanghai, Guangzhou and Sichuan respectively to co-produce regional market reports.

Notable information
Gamma Data is a professional research institute covering every vertical area of the cultural and creative industry while attaching the greatest attention to the fastest growing, the most dynamic and attractive game, film and television industry in China. Its research provides mass and fine-grained data by investigating the game industry as well as the motion picture and television industry meticulously on each dimension.

Activities
CNG Forum is a series of activities organized by Gamma Data, which is of great influence in the field of investment in the mainland of China. Simultaneously, CNG forum has drawn a great deal of attention from global investors.

In June 2017, Shanghai Game Elite Summit Forum was directed by the Press and Publication Bureau of Shanghai, hosted by Gamma Data, and co-organized by Guotai Junan Securities.

In July 2017, The symposium with the theme “Revolution & Integration”, was co-hosted by Gamma Data and Haitong Securities. "2017 Listed Chinese Gaming Company Competitiveness Report (A-share)" was issued at the symposium.

In April 2018, CNG Forum HK2018 was hosted by Gamma Data and co-organized by CITIC Securities and CLSA. As a high-end of the game symposium as well as docking enterprise fair, a large number of top executives and professionals from gaming companies, global financial institutions, and media companies celebrated the event together.

References

External links 
Official website 

Research institutes in China